Dinner at Eight is a 1932 American play by George S. Kaufman and Edna Ferber. The plot deals with the Jordan family, who are planning a society dinner, and what they, as well as various friends and acquaintances—all of whom have their own problems and ambitions‚ do as they prepare for the event. The film adaptation Dinner at Eight followed and Mentone Productions released the spoof Supper at Six. Several revivals, a made-for-TV movie, and an opera followed.

1932 Broadway production
Dinner at Eight, a three act Broadway play, opened October 22, 1932, at the Music Box Theatre, and closed May 6, 1933, after 232 performances. The play was produced by Sam H. Harris, staged by George S. Kaufman; Assistant Director: Robert B. Sinclair. To date the original 1932 Broadway production of Dinner at Eight has had the longest run with 232 performances vs. the 1933, 1966 and 2002 revivals with 218, 127 and 45 performances, respectively.

Main cast: 
 Ann Andrews as Millicent Jordan
 Marguerite Churchill as Paula Jordan
 Constance Collier as Carlotta Vance
 Malcolm Duncan as Oliver Jordan
 Austin Fairman as Dr J. Wayne Talbot
 Cesar Romero as Ricci
 Paul Harvey as Dan Packard
 Sam Levene as Max Kane
 Conway Tearle as Larry Renault
 Judith Wood as Kitty Packard
 Olive Wyndham as Lucy Talbot

1933 London production
The original West End production of Dinner at Eight opened at the Palace Theatre on January 6, 1933, and ran for 218 performances, directed by Kaufman and produced by Charles B. Cochran. Incidental music was composed by Hyam Greenbaum. The sets were designed by Livingston Platt.

Main cast:
 Irene Vanbrugh as Millicent Jordan
 Jane Baxter as Dora
 Ivan Brandt as Gustave
 Tristan Rawson as Oliver Jordan
 Margaret Vines as Paula Jordon
 Leslie Perrins as Ricci
 Mabel Terry-Lewis as Hattie Loomis
 Edie Martin as Miss Copeland
 Laura Cowie as Carlotta Vance
 Lyn Harding as Dan Packard
 Carol Goodner as Kitty Packard
 Marjorie Gabain as Tina
 Martin Lewis as Dr J. Wayne Talbot
 Basil Sydney as Larry Renault
 Susan Richmond as Miss Alden
 Juliet Mansel as Lucy Talbot
 Dora Gregory as Mrs Wendel

1966 Broadway revival
The revival opened on Broadway on September 27, 1966, at the Alvin Theatre and closed on January 14, 1967, after 127 performances.

Produced by Elliot Martin, Lester Osterman, Jr., Alan King and Walter A. Hyman, Ltd. The play was directed by Tyrone Guthrie.
Main cast

 Judith Barcroft as Paula Jordan
 Robert Burr as Dan Packard
 Mindy Carson as Lucy Talbot
 Arlene Francis as Carlotta Vance
 June Havoc as Millicent Jordan
 Phil Leeds as Max Kane
 Jeffrey Lynn as Dr J. Wayne Talbot
 Darren McGavin as Larry Renault
 Walter Pidgeon as Oliver Jordan
 Pamela Tiffin as Kitty Packard

2002 Broadway revival
The revival opened on Broadway on December 19, 2002, and closed on January 26, 2003, after 45 performances and 28 previews. Produced by Lincoln Center Theater, André Bishop: Artistic Director; Bernard Gersten: Executive Producer. Directed by Gerald Gutierrez.
Main cast
 Joanne Camp as Lucy Talbot
 Kevin Conway as Dan Packard
 John Dossett as Dr. J. Wayne Talbot
 Christine Ebersole as Millicent Jordan
 Joe Grifasi as Max Kane
 Byron Jennings as Larry Renault
 James Rebhorn as Oliver Jordan
 Marian Seldes as Carlotta Vance
 Emily Skinner as Kitty Packard
 Samantha Soule as Paula Jordan
 David Wohl as Mr. Fitch

The play received 2003 Tony Award nominations for Best Revival of a Play, Best Featured Actress in a Play (Ebersole and Seldes), Best Scenic Design (John Lee Beatty), and Best Costume Design (Catherine Zuber).

Adaptations

Adaptations of the play include:

 Dinner at Eight, a 1933 film directed by George Cukor
 "Dinner at Eight", a June 1, 1955, episode of Front Row Center on CBS television.  
 Dinner at Eight, a 1989 made-for-TV film directed by Ron Lagomarsino
 Dinner at Eight, a 2017 opera by William Bolcom

References

External links
 

1932 plays
Broadway plays
American plays adapted into films
Plays by Edna Ferber
Plays by George S. Kaufman
Plays adapted into operas